Daultala, is a town and union council located in Gujar Khan Tehsil, Rawalpindi District, Punjab, Pakistan. According to the 2017 Census, it has a population of 51,895.

References

Populated places in Gujar Khan Tehsil
Union councils of Gujar Khan Tehsil